Galina Peneva Ivanova, born 28 June 1973), known professionally as Gloria, is a Bulgarian singer, sometimes referred to as the "Prima of Bulgarian pop-folk music". She was awarded the title Singer of the year in 1999, 2000, 2003 and 2004, and Singer of the decade in 2007. Gloria is the only representative of the pop-folk genre with 4 independent concerts in Hall 1 of the prestigious National Palace of Culture in Sofia.

Early life
Gloria was born to Stefka Ivanova and Penko Ivanov on 28 June 1973 in Ruse, Bulgaria, and after her parents' divorce was raised with her brother by their grandparents in the town of Ruse.

Music 
Gloria has been a performer since 1992. Her debut album Щастието е Магия ("The Happiness is Magic") sold over 100 000 copies. За Добро или Зло ("For Good or Evil"), her second album, topped the charts with 400 000 – 500 000 copies, achieving a golden status in Bulgaria. On 2000 she released 12 Диаманта ("12 Diamonds"), which became certified as golden by The Bulgarian Association of Music Producers (BAMP). But perhaps the biggest hits in her career came with the release of her ninth album Крепост ("Fortress") in 2003. Her twelfth studio album Благодаря was released in Bulgaria in March 2007 and it sold over 16 000 physical copies within the first week of release.

Gloria has been a jury in Music Idol and participated in the reality show Dancing Stars. She has duets with the artists Azis and Toni Dacheva.

On her birthday (28 June) she surprised her fans with a new title – her album Пясъчни Кули (Sand Towers). The album topped the charts in Bulgaria for 6 following months.

Her best known songs are "Krepost" ("Fortress"), "Nostalgia", "Fenix", "Angel s dyavolska dusha" ("Angel with a Devil Soul"), "Ako biah se rodila reka" ("If I was born as a river"), "Iluzia" ("Illusion"), "Otkradnat mig" ("Stolen moment"), "Luboven dajd" ("Love rain"), "Ne sme bezgreshni" ("We are not sinless"), "Prisada" ("Sentence"), "Ako te nqma" ("If you are not here") and "Piasachni kuli" ("Sand towers").

Discography

Albums 
 Shtastieto e Magiya (The Happiness is Magic), 1994 (in Bulgarian – Щастието е магия)
 Za Dobro ili Zlo (For Good or Evil), 1995 (in Bulgarian – За добро или зло)
 Angel s Dyavolska Dusha (Angel with a Devil Soul), 1996 (in Bulgarian – Ангел с дяволска душа)
 Nostalgiya (Nostalgia), 1997 (in Bulgarian – Носталгия)
 100% Zhena (100% Woman), 1998 (in Bulgarian – 100% жена)
 Gloria – The Best, 1999
 12 Diyamanta (12 Diamonds), 2000 (in Bulgarian – 12 Диаманта)
 Iluziya (Illusion), 2001 (in Bulgarian – Илюзия)
 Krepost (Fortress), 2003 (in Bulgarian – Крепост)
 10 Godini (10 Years), 2004 (in Bulgarian – 10 Години)
 Vlyubena v Zhivota (In Love with Life), 2005 (in Bulgarian – Влюбена в живота)
 Blagodarya (Thank You), 2007 (in Bulgarian – Благодаря)
 15 Godini zlatni hitove (15 Years golden hits), 2009 (in Bulgarian – 15 Години златни хитове)
 Imam nuzhda ot teb (I need you), 2011 (in Bulgarian – Имам нужда от теб)
 Puteki (Paths), 2013 (in Bulgarian – Пътеки)
 Piasuchni Kuli (Sand Towers), 2015 (in Bulgarian – Пясъчни кули)
 Lubovta nastoqva (The love insists), 2019 (in Bulgarian - Любовта настоява)

Video albums 
Shtastieto e Magiya (The Happiness is Magic), 1995 (Bulgarian: Щастието е магия) (VHS)
 Za Dobro ili Zlo (For Good or Evil), 1996 (За добро или зло)(VHS)
 Nostalgiya (Nostalgia), 1997 (Носталгия) (VHS)
 100% Zhena (100% Woman), 1998 (100% жена) (VHS)
 12 Diyamanta (12 Diamonds), 2000 (12 Диаманта) (VHS)
 Best Video Selection I, 2003 (DVD, VHS)
 Krepost — Live (Fortress-Live),2003 (Крепост — Live) (DVD, VHS)
 Best Video Selection II, 2007 (DVD)
 Gloria-15 Godini(Gloria-15 Years), 2010(Глория – 15 години) (DVD)
 Best Video Selection III, 2012 (DVD)
 Gloria-20 Godini(Gloria-20 Years), 2016(Глория – 20 години) (DVD)

Singles since 1999 

 1999
 Погрешен адрес (Mistaken address)
 Не мога без тебе (I can't with you)
 Досаден ден (Tedious day)
 Тайната на успеха (The secret of success)
 Кукла на конци (Doll on thread)
 Folk radio
 Latino fiesta
 2000
 Златна клетка (Gold cage)
 Червена светлина (Red lighting)
 Сбогом, Adios (Goodbye Adios)
 Дива нощ(Wild night)
 Като куче и котка (Like dog and cat)
 2001
 Жените са цветя (Women are flowers) duet with Toni Dacheva
 Илюзия (Illusion)
 Ако бях се родила река (If I was born a river)
 Добре дошъл (Welcome)
 Любовен дъжд (Lovely rain)
 2002
 Ne ostaryvai, mamo (Do not become old mother)
 Po navik (Out of habit) duet with Iliya Zagorov
 Ledena kralitsa (Ice queen)
 2003
 Feniks (Phoenix)
 Labirint (Labyrinth)
 Krepost (Fortress)
 Ochakvane (Anticipation)
 Ne zaslushavash (You are undeserving)
 2004
 Ne sme bezgreshni (We're not without fault) duet with Azis
 Prisyda (Sentence)
 Nameri si maistora (You've found your master)
 2005
 Izpoved (Confession)
 Vlyubena v zhivota (In love with life)
 Spasenie (Saving)
 Piyna vishna (Intoxicated morello) 
 50 na 50 (50 on 50)
 Svoboda (Freedom)
 2006
 Happy end
 Obich moya (Love of mine)
 Grad na greha (Sin city)
 Prilicham li na vyatara? (Do I look like the wind?)
 Sezoni (Seasons)
 Krygovrat/Ne ostavljaj me (Rotation/Don't leave me) duet featuring the Serbian pop group Luna
 Blagodarya (Thank you)
 2007
 Opiat (Opiate)
 Ako te nyama (If you are not there)
 100 karata lyubov (100 carats of love)
 Na mazhete koyto ne obichah (To the men I didn't love)
 Za parvi pat (For the first time)
 Pravi lyubov a ne voyna (Make love, not war) duet with Azis
 2008
 Ednoposochen pat (One Way Road)
 Dyavolska lyubov (Devilish Love)
 Useshtane za mazh (Feeling for a Man)
 2009
 Krasiv svyat (Beautiful world)
 Mojesh li da me obicash? (Can You Love Me?)
 Lyatno palnoludie (Summer full insanity)
 Hipnoza (Hypnosis)
 2010
 Ostani (Tazi Nost) (Stay (This Night)) feat Deep Zone Project
 Az ne placha (I don't cry) feat Deep Zone Project
 Vyarvam v lyubovta (I Believe in Love)
 Tseluvay oshte, (Kiss Me More)
 Do poslednata salza (Until the last tear)
 Pochti nepoznati (Almost unknown) duet with Iliyan
 2011
 Jenskoto sarce (The female heart)
 Nenasitna (Insatiable)
 2012
 Kralitsa (Queen)
 Dvoina igra (Double game)

References

External links 
 Official Site
 Official Facebook
 Official YouTube channel

1973 births
Living people
21st-century Bulgarian women singers
Bulgarian folk-pop singers
People from Ruse, Bulgaria
Payner artists
20th-century Bulgarian women singers
Bulgarian pop musicians